Frauke is a feminine German given name. Notable people with the name include:

Frauke Dirickx (born 1980), Belgian volleyball player
Frauke Eigen (born 1969), German photographer and artist
Frauke Eickhoff (born 1967), German judoka
Frauke Finsterwalder (born 1975), German film director and screenwriter
Frauke Liebs (1985–2006), German murder victim 
Frauke Petry (born 1975), German chemist, businesswoman and politician
Frauke Schmitt Gran, German orienteer
Frauke Sonderegger, Swiss orienteer

German feminine given names